Tunde Bamidele, also known by his nickname Rock of Gibraltar (13 May 1953 – 1997) was a Nigerian former footballer who played as a defender for Nigeria in the 1978 African Cup of Nations and in 1980 Summer Olympics. He also played for Raccah Rovers of Kano.

Career
Bamidele played club football for Taraba FC.

He played for the Nigeria national football team at the 1980 and 1982 African Cup of Nations finals.

References

External links

Sport Reference Profile

1953 births
1997 deaths
Date of death missing
Africa Cup of Nations-winning players
Yoruba sportspeople
Nigerian footballers
Nigeria international footballers
Footballers at the 1980 Summer Olympics
Olympic footballers of Nigeria
1978 African Cup of Nations players
1980 African Cup of Nations players
1982 African Cup of Nations players
Association football defenders
Racca Rovers F.C. players
African Games silver medalists for Nigeria
African Games medalists in football
Competitors at the 1978 All-Africa Games